Novyye Sarty (Yañı Hart) is a rural locality (a village) in Lipovsky Selsoviet, Arkhangelsky District, Bashkortostan, Russia. The population was 28 as of 2010. There are 2 streets.

Geography 
Novyye Sarty is located 24 km northwest of Arkhangelskoye (the district's administrative centre) by road. Novochishma is the nearest rural locality.

References 

Rural localities in Arkhangelsky District